Albert Ivanovich Pomortsev (born in September 25, 1939, is a Russian bandy executive. He was the president of the Federation of International Bandy in 1997-2005. When he left the presidency, vice president Seppo Vaihela took over as acting president for a while before Boris Skrynnik was elected as his successor.

Pomortsev was also the president of the Russian Bandy Federation (Федерация хоккея с мячом России) in 1992-2009.

References

Russian bandy executives
1939 births
Living people
Federation of International Bandy presidents
Recipients of the Order of Honour (Russia)
Russian sports executives and administrators
Soviet bandy players
Recipients of the Order "For Merit to the Fatherland", 4th class